Antonio Nicolás "Nico" Romero Díaz (born March 9, 1983) is a Spanish actor. He is probably best known for his performance as Pablo Santos/Julio Santos in the Netflix series Cable Girls , Nick in Eyes of the Roshi (2017), Olmo in Cuento de verano (2015), and Simón Lozano in Ciega a citas (2014)''.

Biography 
A student initially pursuing a career in nursing in Italy, Nico Romero decided to train as an actor, doing it mainly at the Madrid Film Institute where he received a Diploma in Film and Television Interpretation and with Fernando Pizaje. He carried out various courses and workshops with Andrés Lima, María Morales, Chechu Coloráu, Manuel Morón, etc.

Filmography

References

External links

1983 births
Living people
People from Cáceres, Spain
Spanish male television actors
21st-century Spanish male actors